La culpa (English: The Guilt) is a Mexican telenovela produced by Yuri Breña and Pinkye Morris for Televisa. It premiered on Canal de las Estrellas on August 12, 1996 and ended on October 11, 1996.

Tiaré Scanda and Raúl Araiza starred as protagonists, while the leading actors Manuel Ojeda and Pedro Armendariz, Jr. starred as antagonists. Alma Muriel starred as stellar performances.

Plot 
Isabel, adopted daughter of Mariano and Andrea Lagarde, meets Miguel, son of a former boxing champion, middle class but with a bright future. The two fall madly in love, but Miguel is involved in the accident in which Juana Inés, Isabel's sister, dies and Mariano tries to destroy the young man to do justice.

Miguel and Isabel will be forced to leave behind their love and loyalty towards their parents to find the real culprit.

Cast 
 
Tiaré Scanda as Isabel Lagarde
Raúl Araiza as Miguel Nava
Manuel Ojeda as Mariano Lagarde
Alma Muriel as Andrea Lagarde
Paula Sánchez as Juana Inés Lagarde
Pedro Armendáriz, Jr. as Tomás Mendizábal
Delia Casanova as Graciela
Julieta Egurrola as Irma
Manuel "Flaco" Ibáñez as Raúl Nava
Ana Martín as Cuquita Mendizábal
Alfonso Iturralde as Rafael Montalvo
Mario Iván Martínez as Dr. Castellar
Bruno Bichir as Adolfo Mendizábal
Gabriela Araujo as Miriam
Germán Gutiérrez as Víctor
Zaide Silvia Gutiérrez as Nemoria
Evangelina Sosa as Paty
Tina Romero as Lorena
Alicia Montoya as Manuela
Juan Verduzco as Director of University
Ivette Proal as Edith
Gabriela Platas as Blanca
Mauricio Aspe as Toño
Zoraida Gómez as Ceci
Eric del Castillo as Lic. Yllades
Luis Reynoso as Justino
Evelyn Solares as Nemoria'a neighbor
Marco Antonio Zetina as Dr. de la Fuente
Carlos Ramírez as Lic. Marín
Tony Marcin as Connie
Eduardo Cáceres as Molina
Floribel Alejandre as Queta
Evangelina Martínez as Mother Elvira
Adriana Barraza as Social worker
Jeanette Candiani

References

External links

1996 telenovelas
Mexican telenovelas
1996 Mexican television series debuts
1996 Mexican television series endings
Spanish-language telenovelas
Television shows set in Mexico
Televisa telenovelas